The canton of Mignon-et-Boutonne is an administrative division of the Deux-Sèvres department, western France. It was created at the French canton reorganisation which came into effect in March 2015. Its seat is in Mauzé-sur-le-Mignon.

It consists of the following communes:
 
Asnières-en-Poitou
Beauvoir-sur-Niort
Le Bourdet
Brieuil-sur-Chizé
Brioux-sur-Boutonne
Chérigné
Chizé
Ensigné
Les Fosses
La Foye-Monjault
Juillé
Luché-sur-Brioux
Lusseray
Marigny
Mauzé-sur-le-Mignon
Paizay-le-Chapt
Périgné
Plaine-d'Argenson
Prin-Deyrançon
La Rochénard
Saint-Georges-de-Rex
Saint-Hilaire-la-Palud
Secondigné-sur-Belle
Séligné
Val-du-Mignon
Vernoux-sur-Boutonne
Le Vert
Villefollet
Villiers-en-Bois
Villiers-sur-Chizé

References

Cantons of Deux-Sèvres